Zotye Auto (officially Zotye International Automobile Trading Co., Ltd.) is a privately owned Chinese automobile manufacturer based in Yongkang, Zhejiang, China. It is owned by Zotye Holding Group and was established in 2005.

History
Zotye was founded on 2005 by Zotye Holding Group. Previously, Zotye had contracts to only export automotive parts but increased its production to complete cars to take advantage of the expanding Chinese automotive market. In 2005, because of their reputation as a reliable partner, Zotye established contracts for sales subsidiaries in 10 different countries. 
Since 2005, Zotye has expanded its automobile lineup and production numbers. The first model of the brand was a small SUV, the Zotye RX6400, later renamed to Zotye Nomad. The Zotye Nomad bears a remarkable resemblance to the Daihatsu Terios (see also Automotive industry in China).

Zotye's total revenues in 2006 were 2.88 billion RMB (about €290 million). Zotye Auto ranked 352nd with a revenue of 20.80 billion RMB and a profit of 1.13 billion RMB on Top 500 Chinese Companies List released by Fortune China on July 10, 2018.

Current models

Series E

E30 EV

The E30 EV is a small electric car that looks very much like the older version of the Smart Fortwo.  Launched at the 2015 Shanghai Auto Show, its body shares the look of the Smart’s individually painted Tridion safety cell and wheel-in-each-corner layout.  It has a 1765mm wheelbase, and measures 2798mm long, 1563mm wide, and 1572mm tall - smaller than the equivalent Smart Car. The central console is reported as having been inspired by the Tesla Model S, with a large touch screen.  The electric drive is built around a 17.6kWh battery and an electric motor that provides up to 18 kW of power and 83NM of torque. Zotye claim that the E30 has a top speed exceeding 80 km/h and a driving range of 150 km.  In 2016 the company reported sales of just 3,471 units.

E200 EV

The E20 EV is an even smaller electric car that also looks a bit like the older version of the Smart Fortwo.  Also launched in 2015 in Shanghai its electric drive is built around a Lithium ion battery and an electric motor that provides up to 82NM of torque. Zotye claim that the E200 has a top speed exceeding 80 km/h and a driving range of 120 km.  In 2016 the company reported sales of 13,154 units.

E300 EV
The E300 is a multi purpose vehicle based on the Fiat Multipla but using an electric power train instead of the petrol engined M300.
The E300 MPV has 6 seats 5 doors and the floor pan of the Fiat Bravo.

Series Z

Z100

At the 2013 Shanghai Auto Show, Zotye introduced their new Z100 model, a five-door hatchback city car, with a design very much inspired from the seventh generation Suzuki Alto. The model was initially revealed one year before as the New Jiangnan TT. It is one of the cheapest cars on the Chinese market.

Z200/ Z200HB

The Zotye Z200 and Z200HB are subcompact sedans and hatchback based on the Fiat Siena and Palio respectively. Fiat sold the Siena and Palio platforms to Zotye in 2008. Initial names of the Z200 and Z200HB are Langjun and Langjie respectively, but the products were later renamed to fit into the new Zotye product line.

Z300/ Z360

The Z300 four-door compact saloon was launched in 2012. It has a remarkable likeness to the design of the second generation (2007) Toyota Allion. The facelift version was later renamed to Z360.

Z500/ Z560

The Z500 is a 4-door sedan that was produced since November 2014. It runs on a 1.5 litre 4G15 or 4A91 engine. Transmission choices are a 5 speed manual or a CVT gearbox. The facelift version was renamed to z560.

Z700

The Z700 (formerly known as the Z600) is a sedan produced by Zotye Auto since 2016 positioned above the Z500. It runs on a 1.8 litre turbo or 2.0 litre turbo engine paired with a 6 speed dual clutch gearbox. Pricing is 99,800 yuan to 158,800 yuan.

Series T

T300

The T300 is a Subcompact crossover with styling inspired by the Mazda CX-3.

T500

The T500 is a Compact crossover revealed during the 2017 Shanghai Auto Show and launched in March 2018.

T600

The T600 is a mid-size crossover launched in December 2013, powered by either a 1.5-litre turbo or a 2.0-litre turbo petrol engine. According to much of the media, it has a remarkable resemblance to the Audi Q5 and the Volkswagen Touareg. A higher trim model with completely redesigned front DRG and rear bumper called the Zotye T600 Sport was revealed in May 2016. Another higher trim model featuring redesigned DLO and D pillars called the Zotye T600 Coupe was revealed in March 2017.

T700

Previewed by the T600 S Concept launched on the 2015 Shanghai Auto Show, the T700 has been the flagship SUV of the Zotye brand ever since. It was one of the first original designs coming out of Zotye despite the ongoing copying controversies of other products. Production commenced in May 2017. The T700 is marketed as Zotye Z8 in Vietnamese market.

T800

Based on the T700, the Zotye T800 is a full-size SUV revealed during the 2018 Beijing Auto Show essentially being a longer version of the T700.

T900
The Zotye T900 is a full size SUV produced by Zotye positioned above the Zotye T800. Styling heavily resembles the Land Rover Range Rover Sport and was expected to be launched on to the Chinese market in early 2019 with prices starting around 170,000 yuan or $23,400.

Other series

SR7

The SR7 is a compact crossover of the Zotye brand. It bears striking resemblance to the Audi Q3.

SR9

The SR9 is a mid-size crossover of the Zotye brand. It bears striking resemblance to the Porsche Macan.

Domy X5

The Domy X5 or Damai X5 is a compact crossover of the Zotye brand. It bears striking resemblance to the first generation Volkswagen Tiguan.

Domy X7

The Domy X7 or Damai X7 is a mid-size crossover of the Zotye brand. It bears striking resemblance to the 2015 Volkswagen Cross Coupe GTE Concept and 2018 Volkswagen Atlas Cross Sport Concept.

V10
The small Japanese style minivan was launched in 2011. It runs on a 4G12 engine and 5 speed manual gearbox.

Former models

JN Auto/TT

In 2009, Zotye purchased Jiangnan Auto and acquired their only production model, a facelifted Suzuki Alto which was initially sold as the JN Auto. In late 2010, Zotye released a $2,830 Jiangnan Alto, the cheapest car in China and possibly in the world, and now calls the car Zotye TT.

2008/5008

In 2008, Zotye began exporting the Zotye Nomad, the export name for the 2008 which was launched in China in 2006 as a rebadged Daihatsu Terios. In 2010, Zotye released the Zotye 5008 which is a facelifted Zotye 2008 for the Chinese domestic market. It is still sold as the "Nomad" but also as the Zotye Hunter in various export markers, and also in India as the Premier Rio. Together with LUIS Motors GmbH, Zotye has developed an electric version of the Zotye 5008 for the European market, where it is sold as the "Luis 4U". Zoyte also supplies CKD kits of Nomad to Premier Limited in India to sell a version of this car as Premier Rio, powered by a Peugeot TUD5 diesel engine. Nomads are also sold in South Africa and Latin America. Following a new restyling, it is now marketed as the Zotye T200.

Zotye has an ambitious plan for developing electric cars. It started leasing 5008EVs in Hangzhou in 2010. Production ended in 2013.

M300

In 2009, Zotye released its second car model for the Chinese market, Zotye M300, (originally Multipla) which is a licensed rebadged production of the Fiat Multipla. Production ended in 2013.

T200

The T200 is the facelifted version of the Zotye 5008, adding also a new interior design. Production ended in 2016.

Z200
Zotye launched the Z200 saloon and Z200HB hatchback in 2011, an updated version of the Fiat Palio and Siena which had been built in China by Nanjing Fiat from 2001 to 2006 with little success, and Zotye purchased the tooling for these cars in 2008. The Z200 stopped production in 2014.

Future models
Zotye has bought production tooling and manufacturing rights for a number of phased out cars from big automobile manufacturers to produce cars for the Chinese market, mainly from Fiat. Future models proposed include:

D Series (Fiat Doblo)
L Series (Lancia Lybra in modernised notchback sedan or station wagon designs)
S Series (Fiat Strada)
A range of four All-terrain vehicles is also proposed, called the Zotye ZT01.

Product Gallery

Sales
''

References

External links 

Zotye Auto International
Zotye Auto

Companies based in Zhejiang
Companies established in 2005
Motor vehicle manufacturers of China
Chinese brands
2005 establishments in China